Ayrton Pinheiro Victor (born 6 May 1994) is a Brazilian professional footballer who plays for the FC Mantois 78 in the French Championnat National 2.

Career

Early career
Ayrton was with Corinthians academy, before progressing to the reserve side in 2014. He spent time on loan with Segunda Liga side União da Madeira and Tigres do Brasil, before transferring to United Soccer League side Swope Park Rangers on 13 May 2016.

Swope Park Rangers
Ayrton signed for the USL affiliate of Sporting Kansas City, the Swope Park Rangers on 13 May 2016. He scored his first goal against Oklahoma City Energy FC on 18 June before adding three assists in the space of two games in late July against Orange County Blues FC and San Antonio FC.

References

External links
KC bio

1994 births
Living people
Footballers from São Paulo
Association football midfielders
Brazilian footballers
Brazilian expatriate footballers
USL Championship players
Liga Portugal 2 players
C.F. União players
Sporting Kansas City II players
Esporte Clube Tigres do Brasil players
Esporte Clube Rio Verde players
FC Montceau Bourgogne players
SC Toulon players
Brazilian expatriate sportspeople in Portugal
Brazilian expatriate sportspeople in the United States
Brazilian expatriate sportspeople in France
Expatriate soccer players in the United States
Expatriate footballers in Portugal
Expatriate footballers in France